Jamhuri Day (Republic Day) is a national holiday in Kenya, celebrated on 12 December each year. Jamhuri is the Swahili word for "republic" and the holiday is meant to officially mark the date when Kenya became a republic on 12 December 1964, one year and six months after gaining internal self-rule on 1 June 1963 (Madaraka Day) from the United Kingdom.

Trooping of the Colour 
The Trooping of the Colour of the Kenya Defence Forces takes place every Jamhuri Day. The ceremony begins at 11:30 after the President of Kenya, takes the national salute, and inspects the parade. The band plays a slow march followed with a quick march the lone drummer then breaks away to take his position beside number one guard to play the drummers call, signaling the officers of No.1 Guard to take positions to receive the colour. The escort for the colour then marches off to collect the colour as the massed KDF band plays the chosen Kenyan tune. After the hand over and as the Escort presents arms the first verse of the Kenya national anthem is played, then the escort to the colour marches off in a slow march to the tune of the British grenadier guards. The first tune normally played during the march is always 'By land and sea'. The parade concludes by marching to the tune of 'Kenya Daima' as the tri-service parade exits.

Jamhuri Day is occasionally also used by the military to grant infantry battalions their formal Presidential and Regimental Colours. The honoured unit upon being conferred the colours proceeds with the Trooping of the Colour. In such a ceremony the President as Commander-in-Chief is formally dressed in ceremonial Kenya Army red tunic dress and once the flags are consecrated by an Anglican Bishop, Catholic Bishop and Muslim Kadhi the President formally hands the colours to two flagbearers who receive them when down on one knee.

List of units Trooping the Colour

National Awards
During Jamhuri day various Orders, decorations, and medals of Kenya are awarded by the President to Kenyans in recognition of their distinguished service to the country. A National Honours and Awards Committee advises the President as to the eligible recipients who are derived from a list of nominees. Individuals are nominated to the Committee by government ministries, district committees, the Kenya Defence Forces, national police service, religious organisations, non-governmental organisations, individuals and others. Some of the recipients largely members of the military, uniformed services who have exhibited exceptional heroism and athletes who have distinguished themselves are publicly awarded their orders, decorations and medals before the country during national celebrations, whereas the rest are awarded during the State Luncheon or have their names published in the Kenya Gazette.

See also
Republic Day in other countries
Public holidays in Kenya

References

National days
Kenya
National symbols of Kenya
December observances
1964 in Kenya